Michał Kozłowski (born 16 February 1985) is a Polish volleyball player. At the professional club level, he plays for Aluron CMC Warta Zawiercie.

Honours

Clubs
 CEV Champions League
  2021/2022 – with ZAKSA Kędzierzyn-Koźle

 National championships
 2014/2015  Slovenian Cup, with ACH Volley
 2014/2015  Slovenian Championship, with ACH Volley
 2015/2016  Slovenian Championship, with ACH Volley
 2017/2018  Polish Cup, with Trefl Gdańsk
 2021/2022  Polish Cup, with ZAKSA Kędzierzyn-Koźle
 2021/2022  Polish Championship, with ZAKSA Kędzierzyn-Koźle

Youth national team
 2003  CEV U19 European Championship
 2003  European Youth Summer Olympic Festival

Individual awards
 2015: Slovenian Cup – Best Setter

References

External links
 
 Player profile at PlusLiga.pl 
 Player profile at Volleybox.net

1985 births
Living people
People from Gorlice
Polish men's volleyball players
Polish expatriate sportspeople in Slovenia
Expatriate volleyball players in Slovenia
Polish expatriate sportspeople in France
Expatriate volleyball players in France
ZAKSA Kędzierzyn-Koźle players
Stal Nysa players
Effector Kielce players
AZS Częstochowa players
Trefl Gdańsk players
Projekt Warsaw players
Warta Zawiercie players
Setters (volleyball)